The New York Times Guide to Essential Knowledge: A Desk Reference for the Curious Mind is a single-volume reference book by The New York Times. It exceeds one thousand pages in length.

It covers many topics including:

Architecture
Art
Astronomy
Biology
Chemistry
Dance
Economics, Business, and Finance
Film
Geography
Geology
History
Law
Literature
Drama
Mathematics
Media
Medicine
Music
Mythology
Philosophy
Photography
Physics
Religion
Science
Technology
Sports

There is also a reference library which contains a Writer's Guide, Guide to Nutrition, Nations of the World, U.S. States and cities, languages, biographies and a crossword dictionary.

Prominent New York Times writers have contributed with essays on health, the Supreme Court and war, among other topics.

References

Single-volume general reference works
The New York Times